Michael Parsons may refer to:

Michael Parsons (composer) (born 1938), British composer
Michael Parsons (cricketer) (born 1984), English cricketer
Michael Parsons (engineer) (1928–2021), designer of major suspension bridges 
Michael Parsons (Australian footballer) (1960–2009), Australian rules player
Michael Parsons, 6th Earl of Rosse (1906–1979), Irish peer
Mike Parsons (surfer) (born 1965), American surfer 
Michael Parsons (Bermudian footballer) (born 1979), Bermudian soccer player
Mike Parsons (Barchester Healthcare) (born 1950), British entrepreneur, founder of Barchester Healthcare
Michael Parsons (figure skater) (born 1995), American ice dancer
Michael Parsons (singer) (born 1994), British singer from District3
Mike Parsons (born 1942), British former CEO of outdoor equipment company Karrimor

See also
Mike Parson (born 1955), Governor of Missouri since 2018